Argopecten is a genus of saltwater clams, or scallops, marine bivalve mollusks in the family Pectinidae.

Species
Species within the genus Argopecten include:
 Argopecten gibbus (Linnaeus, 1767) — Atlantic calico scallop
 Argopecten irradians  (Lamarck, 1819)  — Atlantic bay scallop (five subspecies)
 Argopecten lineolaris  (Lamarck, 1819)
 Argopecten nucleus (Born, 1778) — nucleus scallop
 Argopecten purpuratus (Lamarck, 1819) — Peruvian calico scallop or Chilean-Peruvian scallop
 Argopecten ventricosus (Sowerby II, 1842)

Extinct species

 Argopecten ameleus  Woodring 1925
 Argopecten antonitaensis  Durham 1950
 Argopecten callidus  Hertlein 1925
 Argopecten crassiradiatus  Clark 1915
 Argopecten cristobalensis  Hertlein 1925
 Argopecten demiurgus  Dall 1898
 Argopecten deserti  Conrad 1855
 Argopecten diminutivus  Hertlein 1927
 Argopecten eboreus yorkensis  Conrad 1867
 Argopecten eccentricus  Gabb 1873
 Argopecten ericellus  Hertlein 1929
 Argopecten evermanni  Jordan and Hertlein 1926
 Argopecten gilbertharrisi  Hodson and Hodson 1927
 Argopecten gratus  del Rio 1992
 Argopecten hakei  Hertlein 1925
 Argopecten inaequalis  Sowerby 1850
 Argopecten insuetus  del Rio 1992
 Argopecten invalidus  Hanna 1924
 Argopecten levicostatus  Toula 1909
 Argopecten mendenhalli  Arnold 1906
 Argopecten nerterus  Woodring 1982
 Argopecten parathetidis  Waller 2011
 Argopecten percarus  Hertlein 1925
 Argopecten revellei  Durham 1950
 Argopecten subdolus  Hertlein 1925
 Argopecten sverdrupi  Durham 1950
 Argopecten thetidis  Sowerby 1850
 Argopecten uselmae  Pilsbry and Johnson 1917
 Argopecten venezualanus  Hodson and Hodson 1927
 Argopecten woodringi  Spieker 1922

References

 Coan, E. V.; Valentich-Scott, P. (2012). Bivalve seashells of tropical West America. Marine bivalve mollusks from Baja California to northern Peru. 2 vols, 1258 pp.

 
Bivalve genera